The  is a class of four DC electric locomotives operated by Tokyo Metropolitan Bureau of Transportation (Toei) in Japan.

Four locos (numbered E5001 to E5004) were delivered from Kawasaki in 2005 for use in hauling linear-motor powered Ōedo Line trainsets to the Magome Workshops on the Asakusa Line in Ōta, Tokyo for heavy overhaul from 2006, following the completion of the Shiodome Link Line. They are single-ended locomotives which work as permanently coupled pairs.

References

Electric locomotives of Japan
Bo-Bo locomotives
1500 V DC locomotives
Toei Subway
Railway locomotives introduced in 2006
Kawasaki locomotives